Edward Dering can refer to:
Edward Dering (priest) (c. 1540–1576), Church of England priest and evangelical preacher
Sir Edward Dering, 1st Baronet (1598–1644), English Member of Parliament for Hythe and Kent
Sir Edward Dering, 2nd Baronet (1625–1684), English Member of Parliament for Kent, East Retford and Hythe
Sir Edward Dering, 3rd Baronet (1650–1689), English Member of Parliament for Kent
Sir Edward Dering, 5th Baronet (1705–1762), British Member of Parliament for Kent
Sir Edward Dering, 6th Baronet (1732–1798), British Member of Parliament for New Romney
Sir Edward Dering, 8th Baronet (1807–1896), British Member of Parliament for Wexford, New Romney and Kent East